Kairi (name) is a female given name and family name.

 given name
 Kairi Harayama (born 1997), Japanese footballer 
 Kairi Himanen (born 1992), Estonian footballer
 Kairi Look (born 1983), Estonian children's author
 Kairi Sane (born 1988), Japanese professional wrestler
 Kairi Kochi (born 1985), Japanese handball 

 surname
 Evanthia Kairi (1799–1866), Greek playwright, poet and feminist

References

Estonian feminine given names